Macrocybe titans is a species of mushroom native to Florida, Central and South America,

This mushroom was described as Tricholoma titans in 1980 by Howard E. Bigelow and  J. W. Kimbrough, before being reclassified in Macrocybe in 1998.

Macrocybe titans form solid, large mushrooms that grow in clumps. Buff-ochre with a darker centre and greyish at the margins, and becoming white with age. The crowded white to pale grey or pale brown gills are sinuate and up to 2 cm thick.

References

External links

Macrocybe titans at Mushroom Expert

Tricholomataceae
Fungi of North America
Fungi of Central America